New York Law School (NYLS) is a private law school in Tribeca, New York City.  NYLS has a full-time day program and a part-time evening program. NYLS's faculty includes 54 full-time and 59 adjunct professors. Notable faculty members include Edward A. Purcell Jr., an authority on the history of the United States Supreme Court, and Nadine Strossen, constitutional law expert and president of the American Civil Liberties Union from 1991 to 2008.

Prominent NYLS alumni include Maurice R. Greenberg, former Chairman and CEO of American International Group Inc. and current Chairman and CEO of C.V. Starr and Co. Inc.; Charles E. Phillips Jr., CEO of Infor and former President of Oracle; and Judith "Judge Judy" Sheindlin, New York family court judge, author, and television personality. Other past graduates include United States Supreme Court Justice John Marshall Harlan II and Wallace Stevens, the Pulitzer Prize-winning poet. According to ABA-required disclosures, 88.2% of the NYLS class of 2015 had obtained employment 10 months after graduation, and 69% of the 2015 class had obtained long-term, full-time JD-required or JD-Advantage employment.

History

Early years

During the winter of 1890, a dispute arose at Columbia Law School over an attempt to introduce the Case Method of study. The Case Method had been pioneered at Harvard Law School by Christopher Columbus Langdell. The dean and founder of Columbia Law School, Theodore Dwight, opposed this method, preferring the traditional method of having students read treatises rather than court decisions.  Because of this disagreement, Dwight and a number of other faculty and students of Columbia Law School left and founded their own law school in Lower Manhattan the following year.

On June 11, 1891, New York Law School was chartered by the State of New York, and the school began operation shortly thereafter. By this time, Theodore Dwight was in poor health, and was not able to be actively involved with the law school, so the position of dean went to one of the other professors from Columbia Law School, George Chase. New York Law School held its first classes on October 1, 1891, in the Equitable Building at 120 Broadway, in Lower Manhattan's Financial District.

In 1892, after only a year in operation, it was the second-largest law school in the United States. Steady increases in enrollment caused the law school to acquire new facilities in 1899, at 35 Nassau Street, only blocks away from the law school's previous location; and by 1904, the law school had become the largest law school in the United States. Continuous growth led the law school to acquire a building of its own in 1908, at 172 Fulton Street, in the Financial District. New York Law School would remain at this site until 1918, when it closed briefly for World War I.

Interwar period
When New York Law School reopened in 1919, it was located in another building at 215 West 23rd Street, in Midtown. However, George Chase contracted an illness that resulted in him running New York Law School for the last three years of his life from his bed; he died in 1924. New York Law School continued without Chase, seeing its enrollment peak in the mid-1920s, but it saw a steady decline after that. At the onset of the Great Depression, the law school began seeing a serious decline in enrollment, which forced the law school to accept a much lower quality of students than they had previously accepted. With much fewer and poorer performing students, the law school moved to smaller facilities at 253 Broadway, just opposite City Hall. In 1936, the law school moved to another location at 63 Park Row, on the opposite side of City Hall Park; it also became coeducational that same year. However, as enrollment was still declining, both because of the Great Depression and because of the military draft started in 1940, and the school closed in 1941. The remaining students that were still enrolled finished their studies at St. John's University School of Law, in Brooklyn.

Reopening
After reopening in 1947, the law school started a new program that was influenced by a committee of alumni headed by New York State Supreme Court Justice Albert Cohn. The law school resumed operations in a building at 244 William Street. In 1954, New York Law School was accredited by the American Bar Association, and in 1962, moved to  facilities at 57 Worth Street, in Tribeca.

Renaissance

In 1973, E. Donald Shapiro became the dean of the law school, and reformed the curriculum, expanding it to include many more classes to train students for more than simply passing the Bar Examination. These reforms, combined with the addition of new Joint Degree Programs with City College of New York in 1975 and Manhattanville College in 1978, helped the law school to recruit new students. Dean Shapiro's reform of the curriculum was behind New York Law School gaining membership to the Association of American Law Schools in 1974. That year, the New York State Department of Education changed its view of the law school, which in 1973 it had criticized in a report as the worst school in the state, proclaiming that the law school had started to undergo a "renaissance."

The buildings of the law school underwent renovation during the leadership of Dean James F. Simon, from 1983 to 1992. Under Simon's successor, Dean Harry H. Wellington, who served in that position until 2000, the curriculum was revised to put greater emphasis on the practical skills of a professional attorney.

21st century

In late June 2006, under the leadership of Dean Richard A. Matasar, New York Law School sold its Bernard H. Mendik building at 240 Church Street. This sale enabled the school to move forward with the sale of $135 million in insured bonds, which were issued through the New York City Industrial Development Agency. The school's securities were given an A3 credit rating by Moody's and an A-minus rating by S&P, both reflective of the school's stable market position and solid financial condition. The proceeds from the building sale have been allocated to the school's endowment, which is now among the top 10 of all American law schools.

The law school opened its first dormitory in the East Village in 2005, and in August 2006, it broke ground on the $190 million expansion and renovation program that transformed its Tribeca campus into a cohesive architectural complex that nearly doubled the school's current size. The centerpiece of the expansion is a new glass-enclosed, nine-level building—five stories above ground and four below, which integrates the law school's existing buildings. The new facility opened in July 2009, followed by the complete renovation of the law school's existing buildings in the spring of 2010.

On December 16, 2008, in connection with the Bernard Madoff scandal, New York Law School filed a lawsuit against J. Ezra Merkin, Ascot Partners, and Merkin's auditor BDO Seidman, LLP, after losing its $3 million investment in Ascot. The lawsuit charged Merkin with recklessness, gross negligence and breach of fiduciary duties.

In May 2012, Anthony W. Crowell became the 16th Dean and President of New York Law School. In 2012, Crowell launched JumpStart, an incentive program for NYLS students who undertake bar prep classes. Following the creation of the JumpStart program, NYLS' bar passage rate registered the highest increase of all NY law schools from 2012 to 2013. In February 2013, NYLS launched a public service scholarship program, which extends full and partial tuition scholarships to city, state, and federal service members and public servants living in New York City. In April 2013, New York Law School announced an expansion of its clinical and experiential learning programs, doubling the number offered from 13 to 26.

On September 5, 2013, New York Law School announced the creation of a two-year J.D. Honors program, slated to begin in January 2015. The program allows selected students to graduate one year sooner at two-thirds of the cost of a traditional three-year J.D. program. Each honors student also receives a $50,000 academic scholarship. The inaugural class of 2015 had 23 honors students selected from 166 applicants. In October 2013, in recognition of the two-year program and other innovations, Crain's New York Business included Dean Crowell in its list of "People to Watch in Higher Education."

In April 2015, NYLS announced a partnership with the University of Rochester's Simon Business School, enabling the business school to move its New York City center to the NYLS campus in Tribeca. The agreement enables both institutions to capitalize on different schedules and to collaborate on shared programs to serve their respective students and alumni. The arrangement created the only co-located law school and business school under one roof in New York City.

NYLS opened the Innovation Center for Law and Technology in August 2015. The Innovation Center prepares NYLS students for careers in the science, media, and technology industries. It offers specific instruction in fields including intellectual property, sports law, entrepreneurship, cybersecurity, fashion law, and privacy. The center is directed by professor Houman B. Shadab.

In November 2015, NYLS announced the creation of The Joe Plumeri Center for Social Justice and Economic Opportunity. Supported by a $5 million gift from businessman Joe Plumeri, the Center houses NYLS' more than twenty legal clinics, provides hands-on legal training for students, and provides free legal services to clients through NYLS' law firm.

Government leaders and judges from the United States often speak at or visit the law school. These have included former President Jimmy Carter; Justices of the Supreme Court Ruth Bader Ginsburg, Harry A. Blackmun, William J. Brennan Jr., Antonin Scalia, Clarence Thomas, and Sandra Day O'Connor; former New York State Governor Mario Cuomo; former New York City Mayors Edward Koch, David Dinkins, Rudolph Giuliani and Michael Bloomberg; Drew S. Days III, U.S. Solicitor General; Thomas Pickering, former U.S. Ambassador to the United Nations; and Chief Prosecutor Luis Moreno Ocampo of the International Criminal Court.  In May 2011, Newark, New Jersey, Mayor Cory Booker gave the commencement address. In October 2011, UN Secretary-General Ban Ki-moon spoke. In March 2012, then-U.S. Senator from Massachusetts, now Secretary of State John Kerry gave the 2012 Sidney Shainwald Public Interest Lecture.

U.S. Supreme Court Justice Stephen Breyer spoke at New York Law School’s Commencement in 2018, ending a four year drought of Supreme Court justices speaking at law school graduations. Earlier in 2018, Justice Ruth Bader Ginsburg spoke at New York Law School, as part of the Sidney Shainwald Public Interest Lecture. In 2020, during the COVID-19 pandemic, New York Law School began offering a simulated Big Law Summer Associate program in partnership with law firm Venable LLP, an eight-week virtual training program to provide students an experience similar to typical work experiences they missed due to the pandemic.
 
In 2021, alumnus Zygi Wilf, owner of the NFL’s Minnesota Vikings, donated $5 million to New York Law School to support public interest law and social justice programs, establish scholarships for 10 students annually, and fund fellowships, and rename the law school’s Impact Center for Public Interest Law as the Wilf Impact Center for Public Interest Law. Also in 2021, New York Law School launched the James Tricarico Jr. Institute for the Business of Law and In-House Counsel with support from alumnus James Tricarico to prepare students for in-house legal careers, a “mini-MBA program,” and other classes and offerings that merge law, technology, and business skills.
 
In 2022, New York Law School redesigned its Evening Division program, now called NYLS Pro, to make a law degree more accessible to working professionals and others with significant work and family responsibilities through additional online courses, new programs, and scholarships. Also in 2022, TV personality and alumna Judge Judy Sheindlin, donated $5 million to New York Law School to create the Judge Judy Sheindlin Honors Scholars Program for women law students, and support young women and girls interested in legal careers through a partnership with Her Honor Mentoring, a nonprofit organization founded by Judge Sheindlin and her step-daughter, Nicole Sheindlin, a class of 1993 alumna. Sheindlin also addressed graduates at the Barclay's Center in the Law School's first in-person Commencement ceremony since 2019.

Admissions

For the class entering in 2021, New York Law School accepted 48.53% of applicants, of those accepted 24.92% enrolled, with enrolled students having an average LSAT score of 155 and an average undergraduate GPA of 3.49.

Costs

The estimated total cost of attendance (including tuition, fees, and living expenses) at New York Law School for the 2015-2016 academic year was $72,903. The cost of tuition itself (i.e. excluding books, fees, living expenses, and other miscellaneous expenses) for 3-year students had not been increased between 2013-2014 and 2015-2016.

According to U.S. News & World Report, the average indebtedness of 2015 NYLS students who incurred law school debt was $161,910, and 80% of 2015 graduates took on debt. According to the same source, the average indebtedness of 2013 graduates who incurred law school debt was $164,739 (not including undergraduate debt), and 84% of 2013 graduates took on debt.

Rankings and reputation

General

The 2017 edition of U.S. News & World Report, released in March 2016, ranked New York Law School at #111 in its list of U.S. law schools up 16 spots from the prior year. That edition recognized the School for its clinical programs, part-time evening division, and diversity. 
Since then, NYLS's ranking has consistently declined and is currently in a 4-way tie for #129 (with Seattle University, Duquesne and Belmont, respectively); representing a 12-spot drop from 2019 when NYLS was also in a 4-way tie for #117 (with the University of St. Thomas, TTU, Gonzaga, and Creighton, respectively).

Specialty
 Ranked #2 nationally among Real Estate Law programs in Law Street's 2016 Law School Rankings.
 Ranked #33 nationally for part-time law students in U.S. News & World Reports 2020 Law School rankings, up from #38 in 2016. 
 Received a top "A" rating for Intellectual Property and Technology Law program, an "A−" for Environmental Law, and a citation for the work of the NYLS Office of Diversity and Inclusion in the Winter 2016 issue of PreLaw Magazine.
 Ranked #1 for Practical Training among New York law schools and #13 nationally by National Jurist magazine in 2015.
 Two-year J.D. honors program listed as one of the "10 Most Promising Innovations in Legal Education" by PreLaw Magazine in 2015.
 LL.M. in Taxation ranked #1 for the sixth consecutive year in the 2015 New York Law Journal Reader Rankings. Ranked #2 in New York State and #15 nationally among Taxation programs by National Jurist, based on rankings made by those hiring corporate tax lawyers.
Miscellaneous
 Ranked in the top 15% of all U.S. law schools for diversity by U.S. News & World Report in 2016.
 NYLS professors Ari Ezra Waldman and Stacy-Ann Elvy named to New York Law Journals 2016 Rising Stars list.
 NYLS student Carlos Valenzuela named one of 25 "Law Students of the Year" in March 2016 issue of The National Jurist.
 Ranked #16 by The Hispanic Outlook in Higher Education Magazine in its December 2015 ranking of "Top 25 Law Schools for Hispanics.
 Ranked #38 nationally among US law schools by The National Law Journal in 2015 for most alumni promoted to law firm partnerships.
 NYLS' Clinical Year recognized by The National Jurist as one of the 15 most innovative clinics in the nation in January 2015.
 Recognized by The National Jurist as one of the best schools in the country for practical training in March 2014.
 In December 2013, Hispanic Outlook magazine named NYLS to its list of Top 25 Law Schools with Majority/Minority Hispanic Enrollment and its list of Top 25 Law Schools Granting Most Degrees to Hispanics.
 Recognized in the top third of law schools for scholarly impact, in a study released by professors at the University of St. Thomas School of Law in July 2012 - using methodology developed by Brian Leiter of the University of Chicago Law School.

Curriculum
New York Law School has three divisions:
 Full Time Day
 Part Time Evening
 Two-Year J.D. Honors Program

It offers the following degrees:
 J.D.
 LL.M. in Taxation.
 LL.M. in American Business Law.
 Joint J.D./LL.M. in Taxation.
 Joint M.B.A./J.D. with Baruch College.
 Joint Bachelor's Degree/J.D. with Stevens Institute of Technology.
 Joint J.D./M.A. with John Jay College of Criminal Justice.

 Location and facilities 
NYLS' main campus is located at 185 West Broadway in Tribeca, Manhattan. The new wing of the campus opened in 2009, featuring classrooms, the law library, and collaboration and event spaces. The modern, 235,000 square foot facility was designed by Smith Group and BKSK Architects and is the first large-scale building to be completed in downtown Manhattan after the attacks of September 11, 2001.

The University of Rochester's New York City center for its Simon School of Business is co-located at the NYLS facility, using class and meeting space primarily on weekends as part of a collaborative arrangement between the two academic institutions.

NYLS provides student housing in connection with Educational Housing Services (EHS), a nonprofit organization that specializes in providing New York City student housing. The shared residence hall is located in St. George Towers in the nearby neighborhood of Brooklyn Heights.

Academic centers
The faculty has established seven academic centers which provide specialized study and offer opportunities for exchange between the students, faculty, and expert practitioners.  These seven academic centers engage many students in advanced research through the John Marshall Harlan Scholars Program, an academic honors program designed for students with the strongest academic credentials. Harlan Scholars affiliate with a center to focus on a particular field of study and complement the broader legal curriculum of the J.D. program.

Center for Business and Financial Law
The Center for Business and Financial Law provides students with skills training in all aspects of corporate, commercial, and financial law. Through courses, events, projects, and research, the Center brings together academics, practitioners, and students to address the challenges that animate business and finance.

C.V. Starr Center for International Law
New York Law School, aided by a grant from the C.V. Starr Foundation, created the C.V. Starr Center for International Law. The Center supports teaching and research in all areas of international law but concentrates on the law of international trade and finance, deriving much of its strength from interaction with New York's business, commercial, financial, and legal communities. The Center organizes symposia events to engage students and faculty in discussions with experts and practitioners in the field. For professional development, the Center offers resources for studying and researching careers in international law.

The Center publishes an academic newsletter. The International Review is the only academic newsletter published by an ABA-accredited law school that reports on a broad range of contemporary international and comparative law issues.

Center for New York City Law
The Center for New York City Law was founded to gather and disseminate information about New York City's laws, rules, and procedures; to sponsor publications, symposia, and conferences on topics related to governing the city; and to suggest reforms to make city government more effective and efficient. The Center's bimonthly publication, City Law, tracks New York City's rules and regulations, how they are enforced, and court challenges to them. Its Web site, Center for New York City Law, contains a searchable library of more than 40,000 administrative decisions of New York City agencies. The Center publishes three newsletters: CityLaw, CityLand and CityReg.

Center for Real Estate Studies
The Center for Real Estate Studies at New York Law School provides students with an opportunity to study both the private practice and public regulation of real estate. Launched in 2007, the Center offers an extensive selection of classroom
courses, advanced seminars, and independent study projects, as well as externships in governmental offices and real estate
firms. It also sponsors conferences, symposia, and continuing legal education programs on a broad spectrum of issues.

Impact Center for Public Interest Law
The Impact Center for Public Interest Law is the Center housing all of the law school's public interest work. The Impact Center's initiatives address  topics such as housing, racial justice, voting rights, public school education, family law, immigration, and criminal justice. The Center develops student and faculty opportunities in public interest law - amicus brief writing, legislative analysis and advocacy, policy research, and community education and litigation - as well as connections within the larger public interest community.

In 2014, the School's Justice Action Center was relaunched as the Impact Center for Public Interest Law. Ever since New York Law School alumnus Senator Robert F. Wagner—the "legislative pilot of the New Deal"—wrote and led the fight to enact the National Labor Relations Act, New York Law School has led on labor and employment law and public policy. In the tradition of Senator Wagner, New York Law School's Impact Center seeks to advance and influence law and public policy with an action-oriented, public-interested agenda.Innovation Center for Law and TechnologyThe Innovation Center, opened in August 2015, prepares NYLS students for careers in the applied sciences, media, and technology industries. It offers specific instruction in fields including intellectual property, sports law, entrepreneurship, cybersecurity, fashion law, and privacy. The center is directed by professor Ari Ezra Waldman.Joe Plumeri Center for Social Justice and Economic Opportunity'''

The creation of the Joe Plumeri Center was first announced in November 2015. Supported by a $5 million gift from businessman Joe Plumeri, the Center will house NYLS' more than twenty legal clinics, provide hands-on legal training for students, and provide free legal services to clients through NYLS' law firm.

 Alumni employment 
According to ABA-required disclosures, 88.2% of the NYLS class of 2015 had obtained employment 10 months after graduation, and 69% of the 2015 class had obtained long-term, full-time JD-required or JD-Advantage employment. 43% of NYLS' Class of 2014 obtained full-time, long-term, JD-required employment nine months after graduation.  New York Law School's 2014 Law School Transparency under-employment score was 23.4%, a decrease of 8.3% from 2013.

According to New York Law School's official 2013 ABA-required disclosures, 44% of the Class of 2013 obtained full-time, long-term, JD-required employment nine months after graduation. New York Law School's Law School Transparency under-employment score is 31.7%, indicating the percentage of the Class of 2013 unemployed, pursuing an additional degree, or working in a non-professional, short-term, or part-time job nine months after graduation.

Notable faculty

Former
 Albert Blaustein, assistant professor (1948–55), constitutional expert.
 Charles Evans Hughes, Secretary of State and Chief Justice of the United States (Supreme Court).
 Annette Gordon-Reed, presidential scholar, expert in American legal history, and winner of the 2008 National Book Award in nonfiction.
 William Kunstler, associate professor; director of the American Civil Liberties Union.
 Theodore R. Kupferman, assistant professor (1954–64), later elected U.S. Congress (1966–69).
 Woodrow Wilson taught constitutional law at the law school before becoming president of Princeton University, governor of New Jersey, and the 28th president of the United States.
 Beth Simone Noveck, former deputy chief technology officer in the Obama Administration, founder of Peer to patent public review of pending US patents and named "Top 50 in IP" in 2008 by Managing IP Today.
 Seth Harris, former Deputy Secretary of Labor, former director of the Labor and Employment Law Program
 Carlin Meyer, professor (1998-2015), feminist, and expert on issues of sex, sexuality, family and gender

Present
Present full-time
 Robert Blecker, pro death penalty activist and star of Robert Blecker Wants Me Dead
 Edward A. Purcell Jr., one of the nation's authorities on history of the US Supreme Court and the federal judicial system. In 2013 he received the "Outstanding Scholar Award" from the American Bar Foundation.
 Nadine Strossen, President of the American Civil Liberties Union (1991–2008), member of the Council on Foreign Relations.

Present adjunct
 Richard B. Bernstein, adjunct professor of constitutional law and legal history.

Notable alumni

Academic
 Philip Milledoler Brett, President of Rutgers University.
 Francis Patrick Garvan, Dean of Fordham University School of Law. Later became head of the Chemical Foundation, which played a role in the founding of the American Institute of Physics, and the National Institutes of Health. Remains the only non-scientist to win the Priestley Medal, the highest honor conferred by the American Chemical Society (ACS) for distinguished service in the field of chemistry.

Business
 Chester Carlson, physicist and former engineer at Bell Labs, while a student at New York Law School in 1938 invented the xerography photocopy process.
 Arthur G. Cohen, NYC real estate developer, founder of Arlen Realty & Development Corporation which became the largest publicly traded REIT; served on Boards of Citicorp, and John Hancock Mutual Fund.
 Maurice R. "Hank" Greenberg, former chairman and CEO of American International Group (AIG); current chairman and CEO of C.V. Starr and Company.
 Leo KoGuan, Chinese American billionaire businessman, co-founder of SHI International Corp, third largest shareholder in Tesla, Inc.
 Richard LaMotta, inventor of Chipwich ice cream sandwich, co-founder of Chipwich Inc., later sold to CoolBrands, and then Dreyer's (Nestle).
 Marc Lasry, Founder and Managing Partner, Avenue Capital Group. Founder and Senior Managing Director, Amroc, and co-owner of the  Milwaukee Bucks of the NBA.
 J. Bruce Llewellyn, majority owner Philadelphia Coca-Cola Bottling Company, co-founder 100 Black Men of America.
 Mario Perillo, a/k/a "Mr. Italy", former chairman and television pitchman for Perillo Tours.
 Charles Phillips, CEO of Infor; former President of Oracle Corporation and former Managing Director of Morgan Stanley.
 Joe Plumeri, former Chairman & CEO of Willis Group Holdings, and owner of the Trenton Thunder.
 Zygmunt Wilf, head of Garden Commercial Properties, and principal owner of the Minnesota Vikings of the NFL.

Civic
 Leo Cherne, executive director of the Research Institute of America; chairman of the executive committee of Freedom House; chairman of the International Rescue Committee. Served on U.S. Select Committee for Western Hemisphere Immigrations and the U.S. Advisory Commission on International Education and Cultural Affairs, as well as the U.S. President's Foreign Intelligence Advisory Board (PFIAB), and the Intelligence Oversight Board.  Awarded the Presidential Medal of Freedom by President Ronald Reagan in 1984.
 Meir Kahane, founder of the Jewish Defense League, assassinated in Manhattan.

Cultural
 Michael H. Hart, author of The 100: A Ranking of the Most Influential Persons in History Arthur Hornblow Jr., movie producer nominated 4 times for Academy Awards Best Picture.
 Arnold Kopelson, won Best Picture Academy Award, a Golden Globe, and an Independent Spirit Award, all for his production of Platoon (1986). Received a Best Picture Academy Award nomination for his production of The Fugitive (1993), and his films have been collectively responsible for 17 Academy Award nominations.
 Ottalie Mark, musicologist, music copyright expert, and first Head of Research for Broadcast Music, Inc.
 Jerry Masucci, record producer, concert and boxing promoter and film maker.  Founded Fania Records (later owned 10 record companies).
 Arthur B. Reeve, mystery author known for the Professor Craig Kennedy series published 20 books, 171 short stories, and was the playwriter on 20 movies. 
 Elmer Rice, Pulitzer Prize–winning playwright, The Adding Machine (1923) and Street Scene (1929), Class of 1912.
 Judith Sheindlin ("Judge Judy"), New York family court judge, author, and television personality.
 Wallace Stevens, Pulitzer Prize–winning poet, Collected Works'' (1955), Class of 1903.
 Miriam Weeks (aka Belle Knox), women’s rights and sex workers’ advocate, pornographic actress.

Government
 Tom Carr, Seattle City Attorney and Boulder City Attorney
 Charles F. Murphy, former NY State Senator
 Bainbridge Colby, United States Secretary of State under President Woodrow Wilson (1920–21).
 Grenville T. Emmet, United States Ambassador to the Netherlands (1934–37) and Austria (1937).
 James W. Gerard, U.S. Ambassador to Germany during World War I, and New York Supreme Court justice.
 Seymour Glanzer, First Chief of the Anti-Fraud Section of the U.S. Attorney's Office in Washington, D.C., and one of three original prosecutors in the Watergate Scandal.
 David N. Kelley, US Attorney for the Southern District of New York (2003–05).
 Andrew C. McCarthy III, columnist for National Review, Assistant US Attorney for the Southern District of New York (1986-2003).
 Ferdinand Pecora, Chief Counsel to the US Senate's Committee on Banking and Currency following the 1932 election of Franklin D. Roosevelt. Led Senate hearings, known as the Pecora Commission into the causes of the Wall Street Crash of 1929, which launched a major reform of the American financial system, that resulted in the Securities Act of 1933 and the Securities Exchange Act of 1934. One of the first members of the Securities Exchange Commission.
 Dan Oates, Chief of Police, Miami Beach Police Department.
 Stirling Fessenden, Chairman (1923-1929) and Secretary-General (1929-1939) of the Shanghai Municipal Council.
 Adrian Zuckerman, U.S. Ambassador to Romania (2019-2021).

Judicial
 Joan Azrack, United States District Court for the Eastern District of New York, 2014–present.
 John S. Buttles, Associate Justice of the Vermont Supreme Court.
 Clarence E. Case, Chief Justice of the New Jersey Supreme Court.
 Albert C. Cohn, New York State Supreme Court justice, and father of lawyer Roy Cohn.
 Michael N. Delagi, member of the New York State Assembly and Municipal Court Justice
 Charles M. Egan, Vice-Chancellor of the New Jersey Chancery Court (1934–1948)
 Charles William Froessel, New York Court of Appeals (1949–1962).
John M. Gallagher, United States District Court for the Eastern District of Pennsylvania (2019–present).
Ernest E. L. Hammer (1884–1970), member of the New York State Assembly and Justice of the New York Supreme Court
Louis D. Gibbs, New York State Assemblyman, Bronx County Court Judge, New York Supreme Court Justice
 John Marshall Harlan II, United States Supreme Court Justice from 1955 to 1971.
 Robert Alexander Inch, Chief Judge of the United States District Court for the Eastern District of New York.
 David Chester Lewis (1884–1975), lawyer, politician, and judge
 Charles C. Lockwood, New York Supreme Court 2nd District (1932–1947).
 Andrew M. Mead, Associate Justice, Maine Supreme Judicial Court
 Roger J. Miner, Chief Judge United States Court of Appeals for the Second Circuit.
 Samuel Seabury, New York Court of Appeals, chaired the NYC court/police corruption investigations known as the Seabury Commission.
 Joel Harvey Slomsky, United States District Court Judge for the Eastern District of Pennsylvania.
 Judith Sheindlin, Criminal Court Judge, New York
 Henry L. Sherman (1870–1938),Justice, New York State Supreme Court, Appellate Division, First Department  
 Saul S. Streit (1897–1983), New York State Assemblyman and New York Supreme Court Justice
 Myron Sulzberger (1878–1956), lawyer, politician, and judge
 Nicholas Tsoucalas, Senior Judge, United States Court of International Trade
 Julian M. Wright, Judge Advocate, International Court, Cairo Egypt

Political
 Robert A. Agresta, Council President, Englewood Cliffs, New Jersey (2009–2011).
 Henry C. Allen, U.S. Congressman from New Jersey (1905–1907).
 Michael Arcuri, former U.S. Congressman, New York's 24th district.
 Mario Biaggi, U.S. Congressman from New York (1969–1988).
 Julio Brady, Lieutenant Governor of the United States Virgin Islands (1983–1987), U.S. attorney, Attorney General and Territorial Court Judge in the U.S. Virgin Islands, judge on the Superior Court.
 Charles J. Carroll, member of the New York State Assembly
 Harry H. Dale, U.S. Congressman from New York (1913–1919).
 Isidore Dollinger. U.S. Congressman from New York (1949–1959).
 Eliot L. Engel, U.S. Congressman, New York's 16th district.
 John J. Fitzgerald, U.S. Congressman from New York (1899–1917).
 Otto G. Foelker, U.S. Congressman from New York (1908–1911).
 Franklin W. Fort (1880–1937), represented New Jersey's 9th congressional district from 1925–1931.
 Elmer H. Geran, U.S. Attorney, and U.S. Congressman for New Jersey.
 Benjamin A. Gilman, U.S. Congressman (1973–2003), Chair of House Committee on International Relations. Previously New York Assemblyman and Assistant Attorney General.
 Daniel J. Griffin, U.S. Congressman from New York (1913–1917).
 Michael Grimm, former U.S. Congressman from the 13th Congressional District of New York (Staten Island/Bay Ridge), elected 2010.
 Clarence E. Hancock, U.S. Congressman from New York (1927–1947).
 Francis Burton Harrison, U.S. Congressman from New York (1903–1913) and Governor-General of the Philippines (1913–1921) under Woodrow Wilson.
 G. Murray Hulbert. U.S. Congressman from New York (1915–1918), resigning to become commissioner of docks and director of the port of New York City; elected president of the Board of Aldermen of New York City (1921), and served as acting mayor during the long illness of Mayor Hylan.
 John F. Hylan, New York City mayor (1918–1925).
 Charles D. Lavine, member New York State Assembly (2004-current) representing the 13th District. 
 Eugene W. Leake, U.S. Congressman from New Jersey (1907–1909).
 Warren I. Lee, U.S. Congressman from New York (1921–1923).
 Frederick R. Lehlbach, U.S. Congressman from New Jersey (1915–1937).
 Samuel Levy, Manhattan Borough President (1931 to 1937).
 Michael McMahon, U.S. Congressman from the 13th Congressional District of New York (Staten Island/Bay Ridge), (2008–2010).
 John Purroy Mitchel, youngest person ever elected Mayor of New York City (1914–1917).
 Guy Molinari, U.S. Congressman from New York (1981–1989). Father of Susan Molinari, former U.S. Congresswoman from New York.
 Frederick W. Mulkey, U.S. Senator from Oregon, twice elected to finish out term of other Senators that died in office. (1907, and 1918 – both times did not seek re-election).
 Charles F.X. O'Brien (1879–1940), represented New Jersey's 12th congressional district from 1921 to 1925.
 James Oddo, currently New York City Council Member and Republican Minority Leader.
 Thomas Francis Smith, U.S. Congressman from New York (1916–1921).
 Martin M. Solomon, New York State Senator (1978–1995).
 Oscar W. Swift, U.S. Congressman from New York (1915–1919).
 John Taber, U.S. Congressman from New York (1923–1963).
 Guy Talarico (born 1955), member of the New Jersey General Assembly.
 William L. Tierney, U.S. Congressman from Connecticut (1931–1933).
Sol Ullman, member of the New York State Assembly.
 Robert F. Wagner, Chairman of the National Labor Board, and then United States Senator from New York from 1927 to 1949, introduced and won passage of the National Labor Relations Act, or Wagner Act.  Father of Robert F. Wagner Jr. mayor of New York City.
 Alton Waldon, U.S. Congressman from New York (1986–1987).
 James J. Walker, New York Assemblyman, Senate Majority Leader, and New York City Mayor (1926–1932).
 Royal H. Weller, U.S Congressman from New York (1923–1929).
 David T. Wilentz, Attorney General of New Jersey (1934-1944).

Sports
 Dawn Aponte, American football executive
 Ashley T. Cole, 1939 New York State World's Fair Commission, Chairman 1945–1965 New York State Racing Commission
 Walter Dukes, all-American basketball player at Seton Hall University, while averaging 26.1 points and 22.2 rebounds per game (still an NCAA record for rebounds in a season). The 2-time NBA All-Star played 8 seasons for the Knicks, Lakers and Pistons, as well as 2 seasons for the Harlem Globetrotters.
 Marvin Powell, Former Pro-bowl NFL player with the New York Jets.

See also

 Law of New York
 List of investors in Bernard L. Madoff Securities

References

External links

 Official website

1891 establishments in New York (state)
Educational institutions established in 1891
Independent law schools in the United States
Law schools in New York City
Tribeca
Universities and colleges in Manhattan
Private universities and colleges in New York City
New York Law School